Sonia Prim Fernández (born 5 November 1984) is a retired Spanish football defender who was the captain of Primera División club Levante. She previously played for Pozuelo and Atlético Madrid.

Career
Prior to her football career, Prim played futsal. At the age of 15, following two league titles at youth level for Lourdes, Prim signed for Pozuelo. She would spend five seasons at the club. In 2004, she signed for Levante. She won the league title with Levante in 2008. In 2010, Prim was required to spend a year in Ávila due to work commitments. As a result, she left Levante for Atlético Madrid. In April 2019, after 13 seasons at Levante over two spells, Prim announced her retirement. A tribute was held for her in the final game of the season against Atlético Madrid. Both clubs presented her with a football shirt at the end of the match, in honour of her time spent at both clubs.

Personal life
Throughout her football career, Prim worked for the national police force. She also holds a degree in Sports Science.

References

External links
Profile at La Liga 

1984 births
Living people
Spanish women's footballers
Primera División (women) players
Levante UD Femenino players
Atlético Madrid Femenino players
Footballers from the Community of Madrid
Women's association football defenders
CF Pozuelo de Alarcón Femenino players
Spain women's youth international footballers